Johnny "Smiler" van Rensburg (9 May 1932 – 28 October 2010 (aged 78)) born in Lichtenburg was a South African amateur bantamweight and professional light/light welter/welter/middleweight boxer of the 1950s and '60s who as an amateur won the gold medal at bantamweight in the Boxing at the 1950 British Empire Games in Auckland, New Zealand, and represented South Africa at bantamweight in the Boxing at the 1952 Summer Olympics in Helsinki, Finland, losing to Amé rico Bonetti of Argentina, and as a professional won the Transvaal (South Africa) (White) lightweight title, South African lightweight title, South African welterweight title, British Empire lightweight title, and British Empire welterweight title, his professional fighting weight varied from , i.e. lightweight to , i.e. Middleweight, he died in Roodepoort, South Africa.

References

External links

Image – Johnny van Rensburg
Article – Johnny van Rensburg dies

1932 births
2010 deaths
Bantamweight boxers
Boxers at the 1950 British Empire Games
Commonwealth Games gold medallists for South Africa
Olympic boxers of South Africa
Boxers at the 1952 Summer Olympics
Light-welterweight boxers
Lightweight boxers
Middleweight boxers
People from Lichtenburg
Welterweight boxers
South African male boxers
Afrikaner people
Commonwealth Games medallists in boxing
Medallists at the 1950 British Empire Games